The name Dolphin has been used for three tropical cyclones in the Western Pacific Ocean. The name was contributed by Hong Kong, and refers to the Chinese white dolphin, a mascot in Hong Kong. It replaced the name Yanyan, which was retired after the 2003 typhoon season.

Typhoon Dolphin (2008) (T0822, 27W, Ulysses) – Category 2 typhoon that did not affect land.
Typhoon Dolphin (2015) (T1507, 07W) — Category 5 super typhoon that churned though the open ocean.
Tropical Storm Dolphin (2020) (T2012, 14W, Marce) – paralleled the southeastern coast of Japan, remained well offshore.

References 

Pacific typhoon set index articles